Norseland is an unincorporated community in Lake Prairie Township, Nicollet County, Minnesota, United States, near St. Peter. It is near the junction of State Highway 22 (MN 22) and Nicollet County Road 52.

Notable person
Henry N. Benson, Minnesota lawyer and politician, was born in Norseland.

References

Unincorporated communities in Nicollet County, Minnesota
Unincorporated communities in Minnesota
Mankato – North Mankato metropolitan area